The Union is the debut album by Canadian rock band the Glorious Sons. Released on September 14, 2014, The Union contains the singles "Heavy", "Lightning" and "The Contender", which led to a 2015 Juno Award nomination for Best Rock Album.

Singles 
 "Heavy"
 "Lightning"
 "The Contender"

Featured 

 "Heavy" featured as the official theme song for WWE's pay-per view event Battleground
 "The Contender" features on FS1's UFC Fightnight
 "The Contender" peaked at #1 on Canadian Rock Radio
 "Sometimes on a Sunday" peaked in the top-10 on Active Rock Radio

Track listing

Personnel 
 Brett Emmons – lead vocals
 Jay Emmons – guitar
 Andrew Young – guitar
 Chris Huot – bass
 Adam Paquette – drums

Charts

References 

2014 debut albums
The Glorious Sons albums
Albums recorded at Noble Street Studios